Byun Hee-bong (born Byun In-chul; June 8, 1942) is a South Korean actor.

Career
Byun In-chul was born in Jangseong County, South Jeolla Province, and attended Salesian High School in Gwangju. He took up law at Chosun University before dropping out to pursue acting. Byun entered the MBC actor's auditions in 1965, and made his acting debut in 1970. A year later in 1971, he became a regular on the landmark police procedural Chief Inspector. He began using the stage name Byun Hee-bong in 1977. Throughout the 1970s, he became known on TV as a character actor who played eccentric men who didn't quite fit in with mainstream Korean society. He transitioned to the big screen in the 1980s, and earlier in his film career, starred in the classic Lee Doo-yong film Eunuch (1986) and A Surrogate Father (1993).

In 2000, Byun appeared in a memorable supporting role in Bong Joon-ho's directorial debut Barking Dogs Never Bite, playing a bizarre apartment maintenance man with a love for dog meat. It rejuvenated his career, and Bong would later cast him in the short film Sink & Rise (2004), and his seminal works crime drama Memories of Murder (2003) and monster movie The Host (2006). The Host became the top-grossing Korean film of all time, and Byun won much acclaim for his performance as the strong-willed patriarch of a "loser" family, including Best Supporting Actor awards at the Asia Pacific Film Festival and Blue Dragon Film Awards.

Among Byun's other notable roles are in martial arts fantasy Volcano High (2001), rural dramedy My Teacher, Mr. Kim (2003), horror comedy To Catch a Virgin Ghost (2004), body swap thriller The Devil's Game (2008), and espionage film The Spies (2012). Byun also continues to be active in television, with his portrayals of endearing, humorous fathers/grandfathers, or stern, cunning professionals.

Filmography

Film

Television

Theater

Awards and nominations

References

External links
 
 
 

South Korean male film actors
South Korean male television actors
South Korean Roman Catholics
South Korean male stage actors
1942 births
Living people
People from South Jeolla Province
20th-century South Korean male actors
21st-century South Korean male actors
People from Jangseong County
Hwangju Byeon clan